John Crosbie (9 October 1895 – 1 February 1982) was a Scottish professional footballer who played as an inside forward in the Scottish Football League for Ayr United and made more than 400 appearances in the Football League for Birmingham. He was capped twice for the Scotland national football team.

Career
As a youth Crosbie played for several clubs in his local Ayrshire area, including the Glenbuck Cherrypickers club which produced many Scottish footballers.

In July 1913, Crosbie signed for Ayr United. When the First World War put a temporary halt to his football career, he volunteered for the Lanarkshire Yeomanry. Ayr's board of directors agreed to keep him on half pay for the duration of his military service. After the war Crosbie returned to play for Ayr United (his brother William also played for the club for two seasons). He won his first full cap for Scotland in 1920 against Wales at Ninian Park, Cardiff. In May of that year he signed for Birmingham for a club record fee of £3,700.

Crosbie played a great part in Birmingham's winning the Second Division championship in the 1920–21 season, playing in every game and creating numerous goals. The following season, he won his second and last cap for Scotland, in a 1–0 win against England at Villa Park, Birmingham. He formed an excellent understanding with Joe Bradford, Birmingham's leading scorer throughout the 1920s. He set up Bradford's goal in the 1931 FA Cup Final, but this was not enough to give his side victory.

After finishing with football, he returned to Scotland and settled in Ayr, where he died in February 1982 aged 86.

Honours
Birmingham
 Football League Second Division champions: 1920–21
 FA Cup runners-up: 1930–31

References

1895 births
Footballers from East Ayrshire
1982 deaths
Scottish footballers
Scotland international footballers
Association football inside forwards
Saltcoats Victoria F.C. players
Ayr United F.C. players
Birmingham City F.C. players
Scottish Junior Football Association players
Scottish Football League players
English Football League players
British Yeomanry soldiers
British Army personnel of World War I
Scotland wartime international footballers
Lanarkshire Yeomanry soldiers
Clyde F.C. wartime guest players
Chesterfield F.C. players
Stourbridge F.C. players
FA Cup Final players